Robinson David Stewart (born 29 May 1972) is a former Swazi sprinter who competed in the men's 100m competition at the 1992 Summer Olympics. He recorded an 11.20, not enough to qualify for the next round past the heats. His personal best is 10.60, set in 1993. He also competed in the 200m contest, recording a 21.97.

References

1972 births
Living people
Swazi male sprinters
Athletes (track and field) at the 1992 Summer Olympics
Olympic athletes of Eswatini
Swazi people of British descent